Kochs Creek is a stream in Warren County in the U.S. state of Missouri.

A variant name was "Kocks Branch". The creek has the name of the local Kock family.

See also
List of rivers of Missouri

References

Rivers of Warren County, Missouri
Rivers of Missouri